The Mengkarak railway station is a Malaysian train station located at and named after the town of Mengkarak, Bera District, Pahang.

Formerly, the station was closed for passenger services, it is used by contractors working on the East Coast Rehabilitation Project.

Bera District
KTM East Coast Line stations
Railway stations in Pahang